Olga Matveyevna Avilova (10 September 1918, Bezhitsa, Bryansk — 27 December 2009, Kyiv) was a Soviet Russian and Ukrainian surgeon, medical researcher in the area of cardiothoracic surgery and pulmonology, pedagogue, Doctor of Medical Sciences (1974), professor (1975), and the head of the department of cardiothoracic surgery and pulmonology at the Kiev Institute of Advanced Training for Physicians (1975–1988). She was a laureate of the State Prize of the USSR in the areas of science and technology (1974), an Honored Scientist of the USSR (1982), and an Honored Doctor of the USSR (1962).

Biography 
Avilova was born in Bezhitsa (now the administrative division of Bryansk).

She was a graduate of Smolensk State Medical Institute (1941). She participated in the Great Patriotic War. She worked as a surgeon for the active front of the army and later as head of the surgical department at the Bryansk regional hospital.

Since 1957, she was head of the department at Kyiv Medical Institute.

In 1974, she defended her doctoral dissertation "Resection of the bronchi and mediastinal trachea." She was a student of academician Nikolai Amosov.

Scientific activities 
Under the leadership of O. M. Avilova an emergency service was created for victims of chest trauma, spontaneous pneumothorax, foreign bodies in the lungs and the esophagus. She was the founder of the department of polytrauma.

She was the author of about 300 scientific works, including 2 monographs. She was an inventor (with at least 34 inventions), and patent holder (in particular, "Method for the treatment of expiratory stenosis of the trachea and bronchi").

Under her leadership one Doctor of Science dissertation and nineteen Candidates of Sciences dissertations were completed.

Selected works 
 Transpleural resections for esophageal and cardial tumors (1960)
 Resection of the bronchi and mediastinal trachea (1971)
 Thoracoscopy in emergency thoracic surgery (1986)
 Chronic esophageal fistulas (1987)

Awards
 Order of the Patriotic War
 Lenin Prize
 Order of the Red Star
 Red Banner of Labor
 USSR State Prize (1974)

Memorial 

She died on 27 December 2009 in Kyiv. She was buried in the capitol at Berkovets Cemetery.

On the eve of the 100th anniversary of the birth of Olga Avilova, the National Bank of Ukraine in September 2018 issued a commemorative coin dedicated to her from the series "Outstanding Figures of Ukraine." On the obverse of the coin, a stylized composition is placed on a mirrored background, symbolizing thoracic surgery. On the reverse there is a portrait of Olga Avilova with a signature under it. It also contains the dates of her birth and death: 1918–2009.

References

Further reading 
 Ольга Матвеевна Авилова (к 80-летию со дня рождения) // Клінічна хірургія. — 1998. — No. 9-10. — С. 105–106.
 Авілова // Ukrainian Soviet Encyclopedia 
 Авілова, Ольга Матвіївна // :uk:Велика українська енциклопедія (Great Ukrainian Encyclopedia)

Lenin Prize winners
Recipients of the Order of the Red Star
Recipients of the Order of the Red Banner of Labour
2009 deaths
1918 births
20th-century women
21st-century women
Ukrainian surgeons
Soviet surgeons
Soviet military doctors